Robert Austin Nichols (born September 20, 1994) is an American professional basketball player. He played college basketball for the University of Memphis and the University of Virginia.

Early years
Nichols attended Briarcrest Christian School in Eads, Tennessee. While there, he was a four-time letterwinner and helped lead his team to the state championship game. Nichols averaged 22.7 points, 12.2 rebounds and 2.6 blocked shots his senior season en route to being named the Gatorade Player of the Year for Tennessee. On November 5, 2012, Nichols committed to the University of Memphis. He had also received offers from Duke, Virginia, Vanderbilt, and Tennessee.

College career

Memphis
Nichols started in all 34 of the Tigers' games his freshman year. It was the first time a Memphis freshman had done so since Darius Washington, Jr. during the 2004-05 season. Nichols was named AAC Rookie of the Year at the end of the season.

During his sophomore year, Nichols would be limited to just 27 games because of several ankle injuries. Despite the injuries, he led the Tigers in scoring (13.3 PPG), was second on the team in rebounds (6.1 RPG), and third in the country in blocked shots (3.4 BPG). At the conclusion of the season, it was announced that Nichols had earned a spot on the All-AAC First Team, becoming the first Tigers player to do so since the reorganization of the American.

The summer following his sophomore season, Nichols requested to be released from his scholarship. The Memphis staff initially refused to let Nichols leave, but eventually granted him a conditional release. The conditions would apply if Nichols transfers to the University of Tennessee, any school in the American Athletic Conference, and any out-of-conference schools that play Memphis during the 2015–16 and 2016-17 seasons. Transferring to one of these schools meant that he would have to pay for his redshirt season before becoming scholarship eligible again once reinstated. The Nichols family hired a lawyer to petition for an unconditional release, and on July 14, 2015, Memphis removed all conditions from Nichols' release.

Virginia
On July 28, 2015, Nichols announced that he was transferring to the University of Virginia. He had also received interest from Notre Dame and Marquette. After sitting out the 2015-16 season as a redshirt, Nichols was scheduled to have two years of eligibility remaining once reinstated.

After being suspended for the opener, Nichols appeared in one game.  He was then dismissed from the team on November 18, 2016.

College statistics

|-
| style="text-align:left;"| 2013–14
| style="text-align:left;"| Memphis
| 34 || 34 || 22.8 || .589 || .000 || .536 || 4.3 || 0.5 || 0.4 || 1.2 || 9.3
|-
| style="text-align:left;"| 2014–15
| style="text-align:left;"| Memphis
| 27 || 26 || 29.5 || .497 || .222 || .607 || 6.1 || 1.0 || 0.8 || 3.4 || 13.3
|-
| style="text-align:left;"| 2016–17
| style="text-align:left;"| Virginia
| 1 || 0 || 16.0 || .571 || .000 || 1.000 || 3.0 || 0.0 || 0.0 || 0.0 || 11.0

Personal life
Austin's parents are Mark and Kim Nichols. He has a twin sister named Ashley and an older sister Natalie. Nichols was majoring in drama.

References

External links
Virginia bio
DraftExpress.com profile

1994 births
Living people
Basketball players from Memphis, Tennessee
Memphis Hustle players
Memphis Tigers men's basketball players
Parade High School All-Americans (boys' basketball)
Power forwards (basketball)
Virginia Cavaliers men's basketball players
American men's basketball players